Giulia Staccioli (born 6 June 1964) is a retired Italian rhythmic gymnast.

She competed for Italy in the rhythmic gymnastics all-around competition at two Olympic Games: in 1984 in Los Angeles and in 1988 in Seoul. In 1984 she placed 7th overall, in 1988 18th.

References

External links 
 Giulia Staccioli at Sports-Reference.com

1964 births
Living people
Italian rhythmic gymnasts
Gymnasts at the 1984 Summer Olympics
Gymnasts at the 1988 Summer Olympics
Olympic gymnasts of Italy
20th-century Italian women